"Only the Lonely" is a song by British band T'Pau, released in 1989 as the third and final single from their second studio album, Rage (1988). It was written by vocalist Carol Decker and rhythm guitarist Ron Rogers, and produced by Roy Thomas Baker. "Only the Lonely " peaked at No. 28 on the UK Singles Chart and remained in the Top 100 for six weeks. For its release as a single, "Only the Lonely" was remixed.

A music video was filmed to promote the single. T'Pau also performed the song on a number of UK TV shows including Going Live!, Top of the Pops, Daytime Live and The Hippodrome Show.

Critical reception
Upon release, William Shaw of Smash Hits commented: "You have to hand it to Carol and Ronnie. They certainly know how to make records that start off quiet and then get louder and louder. T'Pau have already shown a certain adeptness at turning out crunching great ballads of this ilk, but this time what's so extraordinary about it is Carol's singing. One moment she's singing dainty little harmonies, the next moment she's bawling away like a dame possessed. Marvellous." Pan-European magazine Music & Media wrote: "A song that sees Carol Decker in fine voice which might be a chance for T'Pau to regain their rapidly fading status."

Formats
 7" single
"Only the Lonely" (Guitar Remix) - 4:02
"Between the Lines" - 3:35

 12" single
"Only the Lonely" (Nightmare Mix) - 8:00
"Only the Lonely" (Guitar Remix) - 4:02
"Downtown" (Live) - 3:35

 CD single
"Only the Lonely" (Guitar Remix) - 4:03
"Only the Lonely" (Nightmare Mix) - 8:01
"Between the Lines" - 3:35
"Downtown" (Live) - 3:37

Personnel
T'Pau
 Carol Decker – lead vocals
 Dean Howard – lead guitar
 Ronnie Rogers – rhythm guitar, lead vocals on "Downtown"
 Michael Chetwood – keyboards
 Paul Jackson – bass guitar
 Tim Burgess – drums

Production
 Roy Thomas Baker - producer of "Only the Lonely", mixing on "Only the Lonely" and "Between the Lines"
 T'Pau - additional production on "Only the Lonely", producers of "Downtown", mixing on "Between the Lines" and "Downtown"
 Gary Langan - additional production and remixing on "Only the Lonely", producers of "Downtown", mixing on "Downtown"
 Carol Decker, Ronnie Rogers, Tim Burgess - producers of "Between the Lines"
 Stephen W. Tayler - mixing on "Between the Lines"

Other
 Sheila Rock - photography
 Mark Millington - sleeve design

Charts

References

External links

1988 songs
1989 singles
T'Pau (band) songs
Virgin Records singles
Songs written by Carol Decker
Songs written by Ron Rogers
Song recordings produced by Roy Thomas Baker